Donald Duck is a series of American animated comedy short films produced by Walt Disney Productions. The series started in 1937 with Donald's Ostrich (although two previous short films, Don Donald (1937) and Modern Inventions (1937), were later re-released under this series) and ended in 1961 with The Litterbug. The series stars the titular character Donald Duck, in addition to having recurring appearances by previously known characters such as Pluto and Pete, and also introduced well-known characters such as Donald's nephews Huey, Dewey and Louie (previously introduced in comic books) and Donald's love interest Daisy Duck, as well as Donald's recurring rivals Chip 'n' Dale under their names (previously appearing without names in the shorts Private Pluto and Squatter's Rights).

Production
After his debut in the short film The Wise Little Hen from the series Silly Symphony, Donald Duck became a recurring character in the short films of the series Mickey Mouse. Due to his popularity, Donald began starring in his own series of shorts, beginning with Donald's Ostrich on December 10, 1937. Two shorts originally from the Mickey Mouse series, Don Donald (1937) and Modern Inventions (1937), were later re-released as shorts in the Donald Duck series. Similar to the Mickey Mouse series, the Donald Duck shorts begin with a close-up of Donald's face with a starburst behind him, followed by the title "A Walt Disney Donald Duck". The World War II-themed Donald shorts released during the 1940s, in which Donald is shown enlisting in the military, feature a variant of Donald's face with his sailor's hat exchanged for his privater's cap. Other Walt Disney Productions short films starring Donald outside of the Donald Duck series, like How to Have an Accident at Work (1959) – released as A Walt Disney Cartoon – and some educational films from 1960s, also include Donald's starburst picture in their introduction. In the shorts filmed in CinemaScope, also the intro changes to one with Donald shining a flashlight on the image with his face and then the text of the intro.

The series had annual releases from 1937 to 1956, later having a hiatus until the release in 1961 of The Litterbug, the last official short film in the series, and which, unlike the others, was presented without the starburst with Donald's face and under the title "Walt Disney presents Donald Duck".

While Don Donald and Modern Inventions were distributed under United Artist, Donald's Ostrich onwards were distributed by RKO Radio Pictures, with the exception of  Grand Canyonscope (1954) and The Litterbug, distributed under Buena Vista Distribution, which distributed most of the other shorts in re-releases.

The cartoons were directed by 11 different people. Those with the most credits include Jack King (52) and Jack Hannah (48).

List of films
The following is a list of Donald Duck films.

This list does not include shorts from other series in which Donald Duck appears, such as those from the Mickey Mouse series, the Donald & Goofy series, or short films that are not introduced as part of a specific series, nor shorts of Donald Duck made as part of the episodes of the television series Mickey Mouse Works.

1937

1938

1939

1940

1941

1942

1943

1944

1945

1946

1947

1948

1949

1950

1951

1952

1953

1954

1955

1956

1961

Home media
The films have been released in various forms of home media, with selected films released on VHS, laserdisc, and DVD. Starting in 2010, some of the cartoons were made available on the iTunes Store as digital downloads.

The only complete re-release of the entire series has been in the "Walt Disney Treasures" DVD sets. The vast majority of the series appears between four two-disc sets: "The Chronological Donald, Volume One" (2004), "The Chronological Donald, Volume Two" (2005), "The Chronological Donald, Volume Three" (2007), and "The Chronological Donald, Volume Four" (2009). The sets also include several short films starring Donald outside of the Donald Duck series, such as The Wise Little Hen (1934) from the Silly Symphony series, Donald and Pluto (1936) from the Mickey Mouse series, and several propaganda, educational, and commercial films starring Donald. Two shorts of the Donald Duck series, Der Fuehrer's Face (1943) and The Spirit of '43 (1943), are not present in the sets of "The Chronological Donald", instead being included in the "Walt Disney on the Front Lines" set (2004), which also included other World War II-themed Donald Duck shorts.

See also
Silly Symphony
The Wise Little Hen
Mickey Mouse (film series)
Mickey Mouse Works

References

External links
"Donald Duck" at The Encyclopedia Of Disney Animated Shorts

Film series introduced in 1937
Animated film series
Children's film series
Lists of animated films by character

Walt Disney Studios (division) franchises
Disney-related lists
American comedy short films
Slapstick comedy